The National Center for Biotechnology (CNB) forms part of the Spanish National Research Council (CSIC), the largest public research institution in Spain.

The CNB was founded in 1992 to promote research in advanced biotechnology and molecular biology, and to act as a link between basic research and industrial applications.

Mission 
The mission of the CNB is the generation of excellent scientific knowledge and its application to solving human and animal health issues, environmental, and agricultural challenges, whilst collaborating with industries and ensuring the transfer of technology.

The CNB is committed to the training of highly qualified personnel. It offers biotechnology-oriented counselling to companies and public institutions as well as an important communication of its scientific activity in specialized journals and press media.

The most relevant missions of the CNB are the following:

Focus the effort in life sciences research towards a society and an economy based on knowledge
Use this knowledge as a tool to be applied to health, agriculture and environment
Offer services in new technologies to the academic community and private companies
Stimulate private companies towards research and development for biological problems

Research 

The CNB is a multidisciplinary research centre whose greatest efforts are concentrated in the areas of structural biology, molecular biology, virology, microbiology, plant biology, immunology and oncology, and systems and synthetic biology. In all cases, special emphasis is placed on transforming the knowledge generated into applications to benefit mankind.

Specific projects focus on structural biology of large macromolecules, genomics and functional proteomics, development of biocomputing tools, control of cell growth and cancer, mechanisms of aging and apoptosis, development of animal models for chronic autoimmune diseases, infectious and cancer-like diseases, construction of vaccines for humans and farm animals, development of tools to improve plant productivity and resistance to environmental stress, development of new processes for environmental recovery based on microorganisms, production of antibiotics and hydrolytic enzymes, and discovery of immunomodulatory compounds.

Finally, an overarching Program on Systems and Synthetic Biology provides computational and materials tools for modelling complex biological phenomena and reprogramming them in a biotechnological direction.

Technology Transfer

As a biotechnology center, the CNB also has important biotechnological production, and over the 2005-2009 period signed 225 research contracts with companies around the world (amounting to 37.4 M€).

During the same period, 87 patents were applied for, of which 33 were for new inventions; another 33 were applications for entry into the international PCT phase and the rest (21) mainly for European and US applications. Out of these, 13 patents have been licensed.

Likewise, five biotechnology companies have been established by CNB scientists during the 2005-2009, some of them in the CNB spin-off incubator. All this gives a clear idea of the institute’s biotechnological edge. The CNB is a member of ASEBIO (the largest Spanish biotechnological business association) and maintains regular contacts with other members in search of common matters of interest; these include a number of joint grants for which companies and the CNB have applied to different government agencies. Of these, 12 projects were granted from 2005-2009 in programs such as PETRI and PROFIT (amounting to 1.87 M€).

Organization 
It is currently one of the largest Spanish research institutes, with a total staff of 676 (December 2011), of which 381 are scientific staff (65 PIs, 10 research associates, 113 PhD students and 198 postdoctoral scientists), and 236 technical and administrative staff.

The CNB is currently divided in five departments:

Macromolecular Structure Department
Molecular and Cell Biology Department
Microbial Biotechnology Department
Plant Genetics Department
Immunology and Oncology Department

and a Program on Systems and Synthetic Biology

Directors

References

External links 
Web del CNB
La vacuna contra el VIH generada en el CNB logra una respuesta inmune del 90%
La investigación sobre Enfermedades Raras en el Centro Nacional de Biotecnología del CSIC

1985 establishments in Spain
Research institutes in the Community of Madrid